College & Research Libraries is a bimonthly peer-reviewed academic journal published by the Association of College and Research Libraries.

History 
It was established in December 1939 and was published quarterly for its first 18 years, then bimonthly since 1956. It publishes articles that are intended to help academic librarians build an intellectual framework to serve the needs of collegiate users. The editor-in-chief is Wendi Arant Kaspar (Texas A&M University Policy Sciences and Economics Library). The journal is open access since 2011.

Abstracting and indexing information 
The journal is abstracted and indexed in Scopus, Social Sciences Citation Index, America: History and Life, Academic Search Premier, FRANCIS, PASCAL, EBSCO Education Source, Educational research abstracts (ERA), Information Science and Technology Abstracts, Library and Information Science Abstracts, Library Literature and Information Science, and MLA - Modern Language Association Database.

According to Journal Citation Reports, the journal has a 2017 impact factor of 1.626, ranking it 36th out of 88 journals in the category "Information Science & Library Science".

See also 
 :Category:Library science journals

References

External links 
 

Library science journals
English-language journals
Bimonthly journals
Publications established in 1939
Academic journals published by learned and professional societies